The Milligan Buffaloes are the athletic teams that represent Milligan University, located in Milligan College, Tennessee, in intercollegiate sports as a member of the National Association of Intercollegiate Athletics (NAIA), primarily competing in the Appalachian Athletic Conference (AAC) since the 2001–02 academic year.

Varsity teams 
Milligan competes in 29 intercollegiate varsity sports: Men's sports include baseball, basketball, bowling, cross country, cycling, eSports, golf, soccer, swimming, tennis, track & field, triathlon and volleyball; while women's sports include basketball, bowling, cheerleading, cross country, cycling, dance, eSports, flag football, golf, soccer, softball, swimming, tennis, track & field, triathlon and volleyball. Former sports included football and men's disc golf.

Football 
Football was discontinued in 1950 due to financial reasons.

National championships

Team

Notable people 
 Will Little, Major League Baseball umpire
 Doc Ozmer, professional baseball player with the Philadelphia Athletics
 Sonny Smith, College Basketball Coach
 Ryan Kent, 3x All American NAIA Champion of Character

References

External links